Odd Rasdal (6 July 1911 – 4 March 1985) was a Norwegian long-distance runner who specialized in the 10,000 metres.

At the 1936 Summer Olympics he finished ninth in the 10,000 m final in 31:40.4 minutes. He again finished ninth at the 1938 European Championships. He became Norwegian champion in both 5000 and 10,000 metres in the years 1937-1939, and in cross-country running in the years 1935-1939. He represented TIF Viking in Bergen. The Norwegian championships were not held from 1940-1945 due to World War II.

His personal best time over 10,000 metres was 31:02.4 minutes, achieved in September 1939 in Oslo. He held Norwegian records in 10,000 as well as 5000 and 3000 metres.

After retiring he continued as an athletics administrator. He was a deputy board member of the Norwegian Athletics Association from 1951 through 1952 and a board member from 1953 through 1954. He was given the King's Medal of Merit in 1971. He died in 1985.

References

1911 births
1985 deaths
Norwegian male long-distance runners
Athletes (track and field) at the 1936 Summer Olympics
Olympic athletes of Norway
Sportspeople from Bergen
Norwegian sports executives and administrators
Recipients of the King's Medal of Merit